Provincial Trunk Highway 41 (PTH 41) is a short provincial highway in the far southwest region of the Canadian province of Manitoba. It runs from PTH 1 and PR 542 in the village of Kirkella to PTH 16 and PTH 83 just south of Binscarth.

PTH 41 is the main highway through the communities of McAuley and St. Lazare, and follows the Saskatchewan border for most of its length. The majority of the route travels within 10 km (6 mi) of the provincial boundary.

The speed limit is 90 km/h (55 mph).

Major intersections

041